The Bondurant–Farrar Community School District is a rural public school district headquartered in Bondurant, Iowa.

The district is mostly in eastern Polk County, with a small area in Jasper County.  The district serves Bondurant, the unincorporated community of Farrar, and the surrounding rural areas.

Dr. Rich Powers has been superintendent since 2014.  Dr. Powers was selected for the 2020 Superintendent Outstanding Administrator Award by the Iowa Bandmasters Association (IBA).

Schools
 Bondurant–Farrar High School
 Bondurant-Farrar Junior High School
 Bondurant–Farrar Intermediate School
 Anderson Elementary School
 Morris Elementary School

Bondurant–Farrar High School

Athletics 
The Bluejays compete in the Raccoon River Conference in the following sports:

Fall sports
Cross country (boys and girls)
Swimming (girls)
Volleyball (girls)
Football

Winter sports
Basketball (boys and girls)
 Boys' - 1997 Class 2A State Champions
Wrestling 
 1997 Class 1A State Duals Champions 
Swimming (boys)

Spring sports
Track and field (boys and girls)
Golf (boys and girls)
 Girls' - 2009 Class 3A State Champions
Tennis (boys and girls)
Soccer (girls)
Baseball
Softball
 2013 Class 3A State Champions

Enrollment

References

External links
 Bondurant-Farrar Community School District
 FY2022 School District Map

School districts in Iowa
Education in Polk County, Iowa
Education in Jasper County, Iowa